Choristoneura carnana is a species of moth of the family Tortricidae first described by William Barnes and August Busck in 1920. It is found in the United States, where it has been recorded from California and Colorado.

The wingspan is 20–21 mm. Adults have been recorded on wing from May to September.

The larvae feed on Abies concolor, Pseudotsuga macrocarpa, Pseudotsuga menziesii and Pseudotsuga macrocarpa.

Subspecies
Choristoneura carnana carnana
Choristoneura carnana californica Powell, 1964

References

Moths described in 1920
Choristoneura